Josip Vuković (born 2 May 1992) is a Croatian footballer who plays as a midfielder for Saudi Arabian club Al-Faisaly on loan from Hajduk Split.

Club career
Josip Vuković went through the ranks of HNK Hajduk Split, establishing himself, as well, as a regular for the Croatia U19 team in the 2010/2011 season. He was released, however, by Hajduk, in the summer of 2011, and he joined the Druga HNL side NK Dugopolje. Soon after, however, this was followed by injury, forcing Vuković to miss the following 1.5 seasons, returning only in the late stages of the 2012/2013 season. He was re-signed by Hajduk in the summer of 2014  and he made his Prva HNL debut on 24 August 2014, in a 0-2 loss against NK Osijek, after the coach Igor Tudor decided to rest several first-team players.

On 22 June 2018 Josip Vuković signed a three year professional contract with Marítimo.

On 4 January 2023, Vuković joined Saudi club Al-Faisaly on loan.

References

External links
 
 Josip Vuković at hajduk.hr

1992 births
Living people
Footballers from Split, Croatia
Association football midfielders
Croatian footballers
Croatia youth international footballers
NK Dugopolje players
HNK Hajduk Split players
HNK Hajduk Split II players
NK Istra 1961 players
RNK Split players
NK Vitez players
FC Olimpik Donetsk players
C.S. Marítimo players
NK Osijek players
Al-Faisaly FC players
First Football League (Croatia) players
Croatian Football League players
Premier League of Bosnia and Herzegovina players
Ukrainian Premier League players
Primeira Liga players
Campeonato de Portugal (league) players
Saudi First Division League players
Croatian expatriate footballers
Expatriate footballers in Bosnia and Herzegovina
Croatian expatriate sportspeople in Bosnia and Herzegovina
Expatriate footballers in Ukraine
Croatian expatriate sportspeople in Ukraine
Expatriate footballers in Portugal
Croatian expatriate sportspeople in Portugal
Expatriate footballers in Saudi Arabia
Croatian expatriate sportspeople in Saudi Arabia